Gundelach is a surname. Notable people with the surname include:

Finn Olav Gundelach (1925–1981), Danish diplomat and European Commissioner
Hans-Jürgen Gundelach (born 1963), German footballer
Herbert Gundelach (1899–1971), German World War II general 
Herlind Gundelach, German politician 
Mark Gundelach, Danish footballer

See also
Gundlach